Dichlorobis(triphenylphosphine)nickel(II) refers to a pair of metal phosphine complexes with the formula NiCl2[P(C6H5)3]2. The compound exists as two isomers, a paramagnetic dark blue solid and a diamagnetic red solid. These complexes function as catalysts for organic synthesis.

Synthesis and structure
The blue isomer is prepared by treating hydrated nickel chloride with triphenylphosphine in alcohols or glacial acetic acid:
NiCl2•6H2O + 2 PPh3 → NiCl2(PPh3)2 + 6 H2O
When allowed to crystallise from chlorinated solvents, the tetrahedral isomer converts to the square planar isomer.

The square planar form is red and diamagnetic. The phosphine ligands are trans with respective Ni-P and Ni-Cl distances of 2.24 and 2.17 Å. The blue form is paramagnetic and features tetrahedral Ni(II) centers. In this isomer, the Ni-P and Ni-Cl distances are elongated at 2.32 and 2.21 Å.

As illustrated by the title complexes, tetrahedral and square planar isomers coexist in solutions of various four-coordinated nickel(II) complexes. Weak field ligands, as judged by the spectrochemical series, favor tetrahedral geometry and strong field ligands favor the square planar isomer. Both weak field (Cl−) and strong field (PPh3) ligands comprise NiCl2(PPh3)2, hence this compound is borderline between the two geometries. Steric effects also affect the equilibrium; larger ligands favoring the less crowded tetrahedral geometry.

Applications
The complex was first described by Walter Reppe who popularized its use in alkyne trimerisations and carbonylations. Dichlorobis(triphenylphosphine)nickel(II) is a catalyst in Suzuki reactions, although usually inferior in terms of activity.

See also
 Bis(triphenylphosphine)palladium(II) chloride
 Bis(triphenylphosphine)platinum(II) chloride

References

Nickel complexes
Triphenylphosphine complexes
Chloro complexes